Nanshi Subdistrict is a subdistrict situated on the northwestern part of Heping District, Tianjin. it borders Gulou Subdistrict to its north, Guangfudao Subdistrict to its east, Quanyechang Subdistrict to its south, and Xingnan Subdistrict to its west. It had 33,874 inhabitants under its administration as of 2010.

The name Nanshi literally means "Southern City" or "Southern Market".

History

Administrative divisions 
In 2021, Nanshi Subdistrict was composed of 9 communities. They are listed as follows:

Gallery

References 

Township-level divisions of Tianjin
Heping District, Tianjin